Fattu Dhinga  is a village in Kapurthala district of Punjab State, India.

Demography
According to the 2011 of Census India, Fattu Dhinga had 597 houses and a population of 3,174  of which 1,638 people were male and 1,536 female. The literacy rate was 71.76%, lower than the state average of 75.84%.  The population of children under the age of 6 years was 359 (11.31% of the total population) and the child sex ratio was approximately 860, which was higher than the state average of 846.

At that time, 1,161 people were engaged in work activities, being 924 males and 237 females. 21.52% of the population were Scheduled Castes and there were no Scheduled Tribes present.

Air travel connectivity 
The closest airport to the village is Sri Guru Ram Dass Jee International Airport.

Villages in Kapurthala

References

External links
  Villages in Kapurthala
 Kapurthala Villages List

Villages in Kapurthala district